Paolo Buoni is an Italian British renewable energy advocate and marketer. He is the Founder and Director of the first renewable energy Institute in Europe, the Renewable Energy Institute (REI). He is also the Director of the European Energy Centre (EEC) and an alumnus of Edinburgh Napier University. His main achievements are related to promoting best practice in renewable energy for over 3 decades through training courses and conferences and to highlight the importance of training and the lack of technicians working in the renewable energy field.

He was awarded Chartered Marketer status by the Chartered Institute of Marketing following the work he had done with the United Nations Environment Programme by promoting the adoption of sustainable technology and best practice in education.

He is a strong believer of human progress achieved through education, scientific research and sustainable industry.

Biography
Paolo Buoni moved to Edinburgh (Scotland) in 1999 where he attended Edinburgh Napier University. After graduating, Paolo Buoni used the management and marketing skills acquired to work for blue-chip businesses including Kodak and Sony. In the following years, as environmental issues became ever more important, Paolo, who has always had a natural and moral duty towards safeguarding the environment, decided that he was at an appropriate stage in his career to work for a major electronic-recycling company. It was during this time that Paolo Buoni decided to make a contribution towards saving the environment by promoting the use of renewable energy through the European Energy Centre.

Achievements
Following forging connections with the United Nations and several other environmental organisations, including the Italian CSG (Centro Studi Galileo), the European Association AREA (which represents 19 members state associations, 9000 companies and 130,000 individuals working in the sector) and the Indian association TERRE Policy Centre, Paolo has been in charge of launching the Green New Deal with the United Nations-UNEP. Through the European Energy Centre Paolo Buoni has been organising the 14th European Conference on the Latest Technologies in Renewable Energy organised in cooperation with the United Nations Environment Programme.

Paolo Buoni's launch of the Green New Deal in Italy saw an overall increase of 20 per cent of businesses adopting these new technologies. Also, Paolo Buoni launched a major seminar in Maharashtra, India with TERRE Policy Centre and Centro Studi Galileo, to meet the growing demand for renewable energy in India. This seminar introduced solar energy to be adopted by the local populations of Maharashtra and also produced significant media interest.

References

Alumni of Edinburgh Napier University
Living people
Year of birth missing (living people)